The Adessium Foundation is a charitable foundation based in the Netherlands. 

It was created in 2005 by Gerard van Vliet and his family. Since 2021, it has been managed by Saskia van den Dool.

Budget and beneficiaries
Its annual budget is between fifteen and twenty million euros. This is distributed to programs “such as marine conservation and efforts to promote open and democratic societies”. According to Politico, the foundation is a major donor to some of Brussels' most influential NGOs. In 2015 the foundation paid around €18.5 million to organizations such as The European Consumer Organisation, ClientEarth, Corporate Europe Observatory, Finance Watch, Friends of the Earth Europe, Transparency International, Greenpeace, and Zero Waste Europe.

Projects supported by the foundation

Rewilding Europe 
Arena for Journalism in Europe.
European Digital Rights
Global Ocean Commission
Privacy International

Projects formerly supported by the foundation
Bellingcat.
Digital Freedom Foundation (with the Ford Foundation, and the Open Society Foundations).
European Policy Center.
Finance Watch.
African Parks.
United By Tax.

References

External links

Civic organizations
Organizations established in 2005
Global policy organizations
Grants (money)
Journalism organizations in Europe
Nature conservation organisations based in Europe
Rewilding